Baldushk is a village and a former municipality in the Tirana County, central Albania. At the 2015 local government reform it became a subdivision of the municipality Tirana. The population at the 2011 census was 4,576.

Villages 
The municipal unit Baldushk consists of 14 villages:
 Baldushk 
 Balshaban
 Fushas
 Isufmuçaj
 Kakunj
 Koçaj
 Mumajes
 Mustafakoçaj
 Parret
 Shënkoll
 Shpatë
 Shpat i Sipërm
 Vesqi
 Vrap

References 

Administrative units of Tirana
Former municipalities in Tirana County
Villages in Tirana County